Ras Binnah is a small cape  in the northeastern Bari administrative region of Somalia. It is located 20 kilometres southeast of Bargal on the coast of the Guardafui Channel.

References
Ras Binnah, Somalia

Bari, Somalia
Headlands of Somalia